The 2020–21 Xavier Musketeers men's basketball team represented Xavier University during the 2020–21 NCAA Division I men's basketball season as a member of the Big East Conference. Led by third-year head coach Travis Steele, they played their home games at the Cintas Center in Cincinnati, Ohio. They finished the season 13-8, 6-7 in Big East Play to finish in 7th place. They lost in the first round of the Big East tournament to Butler.

Previous season
The Musketeers finished the 2019–20 season 19–13, 8–10 in Big East play to finish tied for sixth place.  As the No. 7 seed in the Big East tournament, Xavier was defeated by DePaul in the first round. The next day, the remainder of the Big East tournament and all other postseason tournaments were canceled due to the ongoing coronavirus pandemic.

Offseason

Departures

Incoming transfers

Recruiting classes

2020 recruiting class

2021 recruiting class

Roster

Schedule and results

|-
!colspan=9 style=| Non-conference regular season

|-
!colspan=9 style=|Big East regular season
|-

|-
!colspan=9 style="|Big East tournament

Rankings

^Coaches did not release a Week 1 poll.

References

Xavier Musketeers men's basketball seasons
Xavier
Xavier
Xavier